Translate from :es:Escucha, :an:Escuita

Escucha is a municipality located in the province of Teruel, Aragon, Spain. According to the 2005 census (INE), the municipality had a population of 1,097 inhabitants.

References 

Municipalities in the Province of Teruel